Hobitit (The Hobbits) is a nine-part Finnish live action fantasy television miniseries directed by Timo Torikka, originally broadcast in 1993 on Yle TV1.

It is based on a six-hour play, The Lord of the Rings, put on by the Suomenlinna Group Theatre, with many of the same actors; the play was in turn an adaptation of J. R. R. Tolkien's The Lord of the Rings. The series quite faithfully adapts the events until The Council of Elrond, and then focuses on the journey of the Hobbits Frodo Baggins and Sam Gamgee. The series was praised in the Finnish press. The Finnish Tolkien society wrote that Hobitit had captured the book's spirit and atmosphere, despite its small budget.

Plot 
The series is based on J. R. R. Tolkien's The Lord of the Rings, in nine episodes. It  omits the parts where the Hobbits Frodo Baggins and Sam Gamgee are not present. The narrator is an older Sam, who tells his story to an audience of young Hobbits several years after the events of the War of the Ring.

In the first episode, titled Bilbo, Sam provides a brief account of the origin of the One Ring and how it came into Gollum's possession. Bilbo Baggins finds the Ring and defeats Gollum in a game of riddles on his way to the Lonely Mountain. 
In episode 2, Tie ("The Road"), Bilbo celebrates his birthday and leaves the Ring to Frodo. On Gandalf's advice, Frodo and Sam leave the Shire; their friends Merry Brandybuck and Pippin Took join them. 
In episode 3, Vanha metsä ("The Old Forest"), the Hobbits travel through the Old Forest, getting into troubles with Old Man Willow and then with a Barrow-wight. They are saved in both cases by Tom Bombadil. Meanwhile, Gandalf heads for Isengard, where he discovers Saruman's betrayal.

In episode 4, Pomppiva poni ("The Prancing Pony"), the Hobbits arrive at Bree's Prancing Pony Inn, where the host Barliman Butterbur gives them a message from Gandalf. They meet Strider (Aragorn), who guides them towards Rivendell, but the Black Riders start to pursue them.
In episode 5, Konkari ("Strider"), the Black Riders wound Frodo but the party manages to reach Rivendell, where Frodo is healed. At The Council of Elrond it is decided that the Ring must be destroyed and the Fellowship of the Ring is formed.
In episode 6, Lorien, the Fellowship travels south via Moria, where the Orcs attack them and Gandalf apparently dies in a fight with a Balrog. The others flee under the leadership of Strider to Lothlórien, where they meet Galadriel. After travelling further south along the Anduin, the Fellowship breaks up: Frodo and Sam continue the journey to Mordor on their own, while Merry and Pippin are captured by the Orcs and Boromir is killed.

In episode 7, Mordor, Frodo and Sam travel through the Emyn Muil to Mordor and face Gollum, who they force to be their guide. It is mentioned (but not shown) that Pippin and Merry freed themselves and helped the Ents destroying Isengard and exiling Saruman; they rejoined with Aragorn, Legolas and Gimli, as well as with Gandalf, who managed to survive the fight with the Balrog.
In episode 8, Tuomiovuori ("Mount Doom"), Gollum guides Frodo and Sam to the Black Gate, which proves to be impassable, and then brings them to Cirith Ungol, where Frodo is paralysed by Shelob.
Finally, in episode 9, Vapautus ("Liberation"), Sam saves Frodo and helps him to reach Mount Doom. At the last moment Frodo declares the Ring as his own, but Gollum bites it from his finger and falls into the mountain's fire, destroying the Ring. Sam and Frodo wake up in Gondor, where they are reunited with Gandalf, Pippin and Merry, and hear that Aragorn has become King of Gondor. The Hobbits head home with Gandalf, who leaves them after reaching Bree; they have to free the Shire from Saruman's rule. Frodo travels to the Grey Havens to leave the Middle-Earth, and Sam concludes his story, hinting that he will soon do the same.

Production 

The broadcaster Yle had the option of adapting the play directly to television, but this approach was rejected as making no sense on screen. This would have meant producing a children's series based on 's musical settings of Tolkien's poems, as in the play, but it proved difficult to relate this to the story, and the approach was abandoned. Instead, Torikka chose to tell the story from the Hobbits' perspective, cutting other parts of Tolkien's narrative. The new series was written and directed by Timo Torikka, who had played Pippin in the play. Edelman was responsible for the soundtrack. 

Hobitit featured nine episodes of 30 minutes each; these aired from 29 March to 24 May 1993, repeated in 1997–1998. Filming locations included the Ryhmäteatteri theatre in Helsinki and Yle's studio production facilities. Some sequences were shot out of doors with natural backgrounds, while a large number of scale models were used for scenes such as of the Shire and the village of Bree. Studio sequences were filmed using bluescreen, allowing landscapes to be added by chroma key compositing.

Coverage of the book 

The series concentrates on the quest undertaken by the Hobbits Frodo and Sam to destroy the Ring. Accordingly it omits the parts of Tolkien's novel, including the epic battles, that are not seen by these characters.

Reception 

In a review in Helsingin Sanomat, Jukka Kajava praised the new family-produced series, which tells a strong story. He praised the acting, including Kari Väänänen's Gollum and 's Sam Gamgee. Four years later, when the series was repeated, Kajava was more critical, stating that the concreteness of the television adaptation might limit the viewer's imagination too much compared to the original work.

Juho Gröndahl, writing in the Finnish Tolkien Society's magazine Legolas in 2004, recalled that Hobitit had succeeded in "capturing the atmosphere and spirit of the book" despite the fact that it was created "on a small budget in quite shocking sets". In addition to the successful acting and "pensive appearance", he attributed the success of the series to a clear choice of perspective, not trying to tell the whole story of Tolkien's novel but focussing on Frodo and Sam's journey. Similarly, Gröndahl was doubtful of Peter Jackson's The Lord of the Rings film trilogy, as he felt that the "epic and flamboyant side of the book that is emphasized in [Jackson's] film adaptation is not the most enduring and interesting aspect" of Tolkien's work.

Cast 
The show's cast included the following actors and roles:

 Taneli Mäkelä – Frodo Baggins [Frodo Reppuli]
  – Samwise Gamgee [Samvais Gamgi]
 – Peregrin Took [Peregrin Tuk]
 Jarmo Hyttinen – Meriadoc Brandybuck [Meriadoc Rankkibuk]
 Vesa Vierikko – Gandalf [Gandalf Harmaa]
 Kari Väänänen – Gollum [Klonkku], Aragorn/Strider [Konkari]
 Ville Virtanen – Legolas
  – Gimli
  – Boromir
 Martti Suosalo – Bilbo Baggins [Bilbo Reppuli]
  – Tom Bombadil
 Leif Wager – Elrond
 Matti Pellonpää – Saruman
  – Barliman Butterbur [Viljami Voivalvatti]

References

External links
 
 

1993 Finnish television series debuts
Finnish television miniseries

Television series set in Middle-earth
Works based on The Lord of the Rings
Yle original programming